Alfonseca is a Spanish surname.  Notable people with the surname include:

Antonio Alfonseca (b. 1972), Dominican baseball pitcher
Juan Bautista Alfonseca (1810–1875), Dominican military officer and composer
Manuel Alfonseca (b. 1946), Spanish writer and university professor
Rosa María Alfonseca (b. 1953), Mexican graphic artist

Spanish-language surnames